Klezmer is a 2015 Polish war-drama film written and directed by Piotr Chrzan. It was screened in the Venice Days section at the 72nd edition of the Venice Film Festival.

Plot

Cast   
 Lesław Żurek as Michal 
 Szymon Nowak as  Marek 
 Weronika Lewon as  Maryska 
 Dorota Kuduk as  Hanka 
 Kamil Przystal as  Witus  
 Ewa Jakubowicz as  Rozalka 
Rafal Mackowiak as Pazyniak

References

External links  

Polish war drama films
2015 directorial debut films
2015 films
2015 war drama films
2015 drama films
Polish World War II films
2010s Polish-language films